The 23 enigma is a belief in the significance of the number 23. The concept of the 23 enigma has been popularized by various books, movies, and conspiracy theories, which suggest that the number 23 appears with unusual frequency in various contexts and may be a symbol of some larger, hidden significance.

Origins
Robert Anton Wilson cites William S. Burroughs as the first person to believe in the 23 enigma. Wilson, in an article in Fortean Times, related the following anecdote:

In literature
The 23 enigma can be seen in:

 Robert Anton Wilson and Robert Shea's 1975 book, The Illuminatus! Trilogy (therein called the "23/17 Phenomenon")
 Wilson's 1977 book Cosmic Trigger I: The Final Secret of the Illuminati (therein called "the Law of Fives" or "the 23 Enigma")
 Arthur Koestler's contribution to The Challenge of Chance: A Mass Experiment in Telepathy and Its Unexpected Outcome (1973)
 Principia Discordia

The text titled Principia Discordia claims that  "All things happen in fives, or are divisible by or are multiples of five, or are somehow directly or indirectly appropriate to 5"—this is referred to as the Law of Fives. The 23 enigma is regarded as a corollary of the Law of Fives because 2 + 3 = 5.

In these works, 23 is considered lucky, unlucky, sinister, strange, sacred to the goddess Eris, or sacred to the unholy gods of the Cthulhu Mythos.

The 23 enigma can be viewed as an example of apophenia, selection bias, and confirmation bias. In interviews, Wilson acknowledged the self-fulfilling nature of the 23 enigma, implying that the real value of the Law of Fives and the 23 enigma is in their demonstration of the mind's ability to perceive "truth" in nearly anything.

In the Illuminatus! Trilogy, Wilson expresses the same view, saying that one can find numerological significance in anything, provided that one has "sufficient cleverness".

In popular culture
Music and art duo The Justified Ancients of Mu Mu (later known as The KLF and the K Foundation) named themselves after the fictional conspiratorial group "The Justified Ancients of Mummu" from Illuminatus!; the number 23 is a recurring theme in the duo's work. Perhaps most infamously, as the K Foundation they performed a performance art piece, K Foundation Burn a Million Quid on 23 August 1994 and subsequently agreed not to publicly discuss the burning for a period of 23 years. 23 years to the day after the burning they returned to launch a novel and discuss why they had burnt the money.

The 2007 film The Number 23, starring Jim Carrey, is the story of a man who becomes obsessed with the number 23 while reading a book of the same title that seems to be about his life.

Industrial music group Throbbing Gristle recounted in great detail the meeting of Burroughs and Captain Clark and the significance of the number 23 in the ballad "The Old Man Smiled."

Spiral Tribe and their associated record label Network23, use the number 23; though this has "nothing to do with any pre-existing individual, group or subculture".  

In the 2010 Stargate Universe season 1 episode 14, titled “Human”, an imagined Dr. Daniel Jackson refers to the 23 Enigma in conversation with Dr. Nicholas Rush. The number 23 is also referenced in the episode as one half of the number of chromosomes in a human cell – 46, a number which appears frequently in the episode.

See also
 Benford's law
 Ideas of reference and delusions of reference
 Texas sharpshooter fallacy

References

External links 
 

Numerology
Robert Anton Wilson